This article provides details of international football games played by the Sudan national football team from 1956 to 1979.

Results

1956

1957

1959

1960

1963

1964

1965

1966

1967

1968

1969

1970

1971

1972

1973

1974

1975

1976

1977

1978

1979

Notes

References

Football in Sudan
Sudan national football team